Emperor Josef II elevated the Reichsfreiherren (Imperial Barons) of Keselstatt to the status of Reichsgrafen (Imperial Counts) in 1776. The title of Count of Kesselstatt (German: Graf von Kesselstatt) is accompanied by the style of His Excellency; wives and daughters of Counts of Kesselstatt would be "Her Excellency Countess Forename of Kesselstatt".  They are cousins of the Princely Family of Liechtenstein.

The family's historic seat was Kesselstatt Palace in Trier, Germany. The palace was completed for Count Karl Friedrich Melchior in 1746. At the beginning of the 20th century, part of the Kesselstatt family settled in Argentina.

Family members 
 Johann Hugo Casimir Graf von Kesselstatt was the highest official in Trier, chief administrator of Elector Clemens Wenceslaus of Saxony from 1761 through 1794
 Franz Joseph – b. 27 Feb 1826 Wien, Austria, d. 4 Jan 1891 Abbazia
 Eugen – b. 10 Jun 1870 Gleichenberg, d. 10 Nov 1933 Grundlsee, Steiermark, Austria
 Franz de Paul – 1894–1938
 Johannes – born on 21 May 1927
 Franz Eugen – born on 1 May 1926
 Rudolf – born on 31 January 1956
 Ferdinand – born on 8 March 1989
 Alexander – born on 13 May 1991
 Georg – born on 31 January 1956
 Clemens – born on 7 June 1959
 Franz – born on 26 May 1961
 Theresa Marielle Aiga Diana Maria – born on 15 July 1999 Wiesbaden, Germany

Counts of Kesselstatt – Argentine Line 
 Clemens – 1899–1938
 Georg – 1905–1990
 Otto – 1928–1984
 Federico – born on 9 April 1964
 Guillermo – born on 5 May 1965
 Maximiliano – born on 9 November 1966
 Roberto – born on 21 January 1968
 Conrado – born on 7 August 1972
 Diego – born on 20 October 1973
 Matias – born on 22 February 1975

References

External links 
 
 

Kesselstatt